Melittin is the main component (40–60% of the dry weight) and the major pain-producing substance of honeybee (Apis mellifera) venom. Melittin is a basic peptide consisting of 26 amino acids.

Function 

The principal function of melittin as a component of bee venom is to cause pain and destruction of tissue of intruders that threaten a beehive.  However, in honey bees, melittin is not only expressed in the venom gland, but also in other tissues when infected with pathogens. The two venom molecules, melittin and secapin, that are over-expressed in honey bees infected with various pathogens, possibly indicate a role for melittin in the immune response of bees to infectious diseases.

Structure 

Melittin is a small peptide with no disulfide bridge; the N-terminal part of the molecule is predominantly hydrophobic and the C-terminal part is hydrophilic and strongly basic.  In water, it forms a tetramer but it also can spontaneously integrate itself into cell membranes.

Mechanism of action 

Injection of melittin into animals and humans causes pain sensation. It has strong surface effects on cell membranes causing pore-formation in epithelial cells and the destruction of red blood cells. Melittin also activates nociceptor (pain receptor) cells through a variety of mechanisms.

Melittin can open thermal nociceptor TRPV1 channels via cyclooxygenase metabolites resulting in depolarization of nociceptor cells.  The pore forming effects in cells causes the release of pro-inflammatory cytokines.  It also activates G-protein-coupled receptor-mediated opening of transient receptor potential channels.  Finally melittin up-regulates the expression of Nav1.8 and Nav1.9 sodium channels in nociceptor cell causing long term action potential firing and pain sensation.

Melittin inhibits protein kinase C, Ca2+/calmodulin-dependent protein kinase II, myosin light chain kinase, and Na+/K+-ATPase (synaptosomal membrane). Melittin blocks transport pumps such as the Na+-K+-ATPase and the H+-K+-ATPase.

Toxicity of a bee sting
Melittin is the main compound in bee venom, accounting for the potential lethality of a bee sting, which causes an anaphylactic reaction in some people. At the sites of multiple stings, localized pain, swelling, and skin redness occur, and if bees are swallowed, life-threatening swelling of the throat and respiratory passages may develop.

Use 

Bee venom therapy has been used in traditional medicine for treating various disorders, although its non-specific toxicity has limited scientific research on its potential effects.

References

External links 
 

Antimicrobial peptides
Insect immunity
Insect proteins